Definiens may refer to:
 Definiens, the word or phrase that defines the definiendum in a definition
 Definiens (company), a German image processing company; its geospatial portfolio was sold to Trimble Navigation in 2010 and the remaining medical part was acquired by MedImmune, a subsidiary of AstraZeneca in 2014